Tony John Boyle (born 19 July 1957 in Lower Hutt) is a former New Zealand cricketer who played for Northern Districts in the Plunket Shield. He is not related to Justin Boyle and David Boyle.

External links
 

1957 births
Living people
New Zealand cricketers
Northern Districts cricketers
Cricketers from Lower Hutt
20th-century New Zealand people